Montserrat is a British Overseas Territory in the Leeward Islands.

First stamps 

The first Montserrat stamps in 1876 were red 1d. and green 6d. stamps of Antigua overprinted MONTSERRAT. The first definitives were issued in 1880.

Leeward Islands issues 
Montserrat used stamps of the Leeward Islands between 1890 and 1903. In 1903, a new set of definitives depicting the coat of arms of Montserrat was issued. Stamps of the Leeward Islands were used concurrently with those of Montserrat until 1956.

See also
Postage stamps and postal history of the Leeward Islands
Revenue stamps of Montserrat

References

Further reading
 Britnor, L. E. Montserrat to 1965; incorporating supplementary information compiled by Charles Freeland. Hail Weston: British West Indies Study Circle, 1998  104p.

Philately of Montserrat